I For India: The Concert for our Times, or simply I for India, was a fundraiser concert created by filmmakers Karan Johar and Zoya Akhtar to help raise funds for the India COVID Response Fund (ICRF) managed by GiveIndia. The concert featured some of the biggest actors, musicians, singers, sportspeople and industrialists in India and around the world, coming together to support COVID-19 relief work in India. Produced by Fountainhead MKTG, the concert was live-streamed on Facebook on 3 May 2020 at 7.30pm IST.

Overview
The concert was announced online by Johar and some of the participating artists on 1 May 2020 on their social media platforms.

The four-hour long concert was streamed live globally on Facebook on Sunday, 3 May 2020 at 7:30pm IST and featured performances and personal messages from 85+ Indian and global stars.

Participants

Appearances
The following personalities appearing during the show:

 Karan Johar
 Zoya Akhtar
 Akshay Kumar
 Anil Kapoor
 Shabana Azmi
 Arjun Kapoor
 Twinkle Khanna
 Sidharth Malhotra
 Ajay–Atul
 Ustad Zakir Hussain
 Vidya Balan
 Jack Black
 Katrina Kaif
 Kartik Aaryan
 Dia Mirza
 Bhumi Pednekar
 Abhishek Bachchan
 Javed Akhtar
 Nawab vs Ziddi
 Kate Bosworth
 Kapil Sharma
 Dulquer Salmaan
 Kareena Kapoor Khan
 Saif Ali Khan
 Parineeti Chopra
 Priyanka Chopra Jonas
 Joe Jonas
 Sophie Turner
 Virat Kohli
 Anoushka Shankar
 Anushka Sharma
 Mindy Kaling
 Lilly Singh
 Gulzar
 Varun Dhawan
 Russell Peters
 Mick Jagger
 Aishwarya Rai Bachchan
 Kevin Jonas
 Mira Nair
 Amitabh Bachchan
 Vicky Kaushal
 Will Smith
 Aditya Roy Kapur
 Farah Khan
 Hariharan
 Kusha Kapila
 Mame Khan
 Nalandaway Foundation
 Rana Daggubati
 Rani Mukherji
 Rohit Sharma
 Sania Mirza
 Shiamak Davar
 Shillong Chamber Choir
 Shruti Haasan

Performances

Response

References

Benefit concerts
2020 concerts
Television shows about the COVID-19 pandemic
COVID-19 pandemic benefit concerts
COVID-19 pandemic in India